John Burrows (16 October 1864 – 3 February 1925) was a journalist, and member of the Queensland Legislative Assembly.

Early days
Burrows was born in Clunes, Victoria, to parents Nicholas Burrows and his wife Elizabeth Jane (née Pollard). After attending state school in Clunes, he moved to Charters Towers in Queensland where he found work as a whipboy in the mines. In 1888 he started as an apprentice printer moving on to be a journalist and eventually proprietor of the Charters Towers Eagle. From 1907 until 1913 he was the editor of the Trinity Times in Cairns and then The Cairns Times from 1913. He finished his working career as a Court shorthand writer from 1920 until 1925.

Political career
In 1901, standing for the Labour Party, Burrows won the seat of Charters Towers, holding it for six years until he was defeated in 1907.

Personal life
A member of the Masons, Burrows died in 1925 and was buried in Lutwyche Cemetery.

References

Members of the Queensland Legislative Assembly
1864 births
1925 deaths
People from Clunes, Victoria
Australian Labor Party members of the Parliament of Queensland